Consuming Impulse (stylized as Consvming Impvlse) is the second album by Dutch death metal band Pestilence, released in 1989. While retaining some of the thrash metal elements from its predecessor Malleus Maleficarum (1988), Consuming Impulse saw the band progress further towards the traditional death metal genre with progressive influences; this can be seen as one of the earliest examples of technical death metal, a subgenre that would be used and expanded on Pestilence's subsequent albums. Consuming Impulse was also their first release with then-new guitarist Patrick Uterwijk, and their last one to feature bassist and vocalist Martin van Drunen.

It was reissued along with Testimony of the Ancients on Roadrunner Records' Two from the Vault series. Decibel gave positive reviews to it as a cult classic.

Track listing

Credits 

Patrick Mameli - guitar, bass
Patrick Uterwijk - guitar
Martin van Drunen - vocals
Marco Foddis - drums

References

Pestilence (band) albums
1989 albums
Roadrunner Records albums
Albums produced by Harris Johns